This is a list of the publications released for the roleplaying game Deadlands: The Weird West, published by Pinnacle Entertainment Group. The game was originally released using its own custom rules, and has since been published using the d20 system, GURPS and Savage Worlds rules.

The Deadlands world was expanded with a post-apocalyptic setting entitled Deadlands: Hell on Earth; a list of the publications for this setting can be found here.

Deadlands: The Weird West
The original Deadlands system used a custom set of rules and was published by Pinnacle Entertainment Group.

Core Rulebooks

Character Classes

Locations

Adventures

Dime Novels
Deadlands Dime Novels were works of short fiction, primarily starring undead gunslinger Ronan Lynch, which also included maps and statistics which gamemasters could use to incorporate elements from the story into their game.

Miscellaneous

Accessories

Cardstock Cowboys
Cardstock Cowboys were a line of 3D stand-up figures that could be used for miniature-based combat in Deadlands games, available in a series of themed packs.

Fiction

Deadlands: The Weird West d20

In 2001, Wizards of the Coast, produced a set of Deadlands rulebooks using their d20 system.

Deadlands Reloaded
In 2006, Pinnacle Entertainment Group again began publishing Deadlands using their Savage Worlds rules, under the name Deadlands: Reloaded. It requires the original Savage Worlds rulebook to use. In 2012 they began publishing Savage Worlds rulebooks for the Hell on Earth setting as well.

Core Rulebooks

Adventures
Savage Worlds adventures come in two formats - Savage Tales, which are designed as standalone adventures, and Plot Point campaigns, which are looser in design and made up of a series of self-contained adventures which link together and build to a climax over time, with the intention that smaller events be woven throughout at the GM's discretion.

One Sheet adventures

Locations

Fiction

Miscellaneous

Accessories

Archetypes
Each publication features several pregenerated character with art, background, and statistics.

Deadlands Noir
 Tenement Men (Kickstarter Exclusive Dime Novel) (2012; PDF)

GURPS Deadlands

Also in 2001, a number of Deadlands rulebooks using the GURPS system were released under license by Steve Jackson Games

Deadlands: The Great Rail Wars
Deadlands: The Great Rail Wars was a skirmish oriented miniatures game produced by Pinnace Entertainment Group for the Deadlands setting. The following are the rulebooks and expansions published for the game.

Novels
 Deluge: A Novel of the Flood, a novelization of the Deadlands: The Flood plot-point campaign (by John Goff, 2008)
 Deadlands: Ghostwalkers (by Jonathan Maberry, published by Tor Books in 2015)
 Deadlands: Thunder Moon Rising (by Jeffrey Mariotte, published by Tor Books in 2016)
 Deadlands: Boneyard (by Seanan McGuire, published by Tor Books in 2017)

Comics
 Deadlands One Shot (Pinnacle and Image Comics, 1999)
 Deadlands: Black Water (Pinnacle, Image Comics and Visionary Comics, 2012)
 Deadlands: Death was Silent (Pinnacle, Image Comics and Visionary Comics, 2012)
 Deadlands: Massacre at Red Wing (Pinnacle, Image Comics and Visionary Comics, 2012)
 Deadlands: The Devil's Six Gun (Pinnacle, Image Comics and Visionary Comics, 2012)
 Deadlands: The Kid (Pinnacle, Visionary Comics, 2012)

Other
 Fist Full Of Zombies - an All Flesh Must Be Eaten sourcebook with conversion notes from Deadlands to Unisystem (Eden Studios, 2004)

External links
 Pinnacle Entertainment Group, present Deadlands publisher.

References

Deadlands
Science fiction role-playing game supplements
Deadlands
Deadlands Noir